Engomegoma is a monotypic genus of flowering plants belonging to the family Olacaceae. The only species is Engomegoma gordonii.

Its native range is Western Central Tropical Africa.

References

Olacaceae
Monotypic Santalales genera